Zythos cupreata is a moth of the family Geometridae first described by Arnold Pagenstecher in 1888. It is found on the Maluku Islands in Indonesia.

References

Moths described in 1888
Scopulini